The Organization for Revolutionary Unity (ORU) was an anti-revisionist Marxist-Leninist organization in the United States. ORU was formed in 1983 from a merger of the Committee for a Proletarian Party (CPP) and the Communist Organization, Bay Area (COBA). These groups, and the ORU itself, were part of the U.S. New Communist Movement that emerged and developed in the late 1960s  and 1970s.

The ORU merged into Freedom Road Socialist Organization in 1986.

References
The merger statement of the Committee for a Proletarian Party (CPP) and the Communist Organization, Bay Area (COBA), March 1983

Anti-revisionist organizations
Communism in the United States
1983 establishments in the United States